Season 4 of the American competitive reality television series Hell's Kitchen began airing on the Fox Network starting on April 1, 2008.  The show was originally planned to air later in the season, but instead was aired as a replacement for shows that were affected by the 2007–2008 Writers Guild of America strike. Episode 5 of season 4 garnered the highest viewership in the show's history at 11.94 million viewers.

Culinary student Christina Machamer won the season and was awarded a "senior sous chef" position with a $250,000 salary at the Gordon Ramsay at The London restaurant in The London West Hollywood hotel – not an executive chef position as mentioned in show-related publicity and press releases. The London West Hollywood restaurant opened on May 27, 2008, while the series was still airing.

Production location 
This season was filmed in the warehouse district in Culver City, California.

Sous chefs and Maître d'hôtel 
 Sous chefs – Scott Leibfried and Gloria Félix
 Maître d'hôtel – Jean-Philippe Susilovic

Contestants 
There were 15 chefs (eight men and seven women) who competed in season four. It is the first season to begin with an odd number of contestants, repeated in season 6 with its total of 17 contestants (because of the addition of a contestant from the previous season).

Notes

Contestant progress 
Each week, the best member (as determined by Ramsay) from the losing team during the latest service period was asked to nominate two of their teammates for elimination; one of these two was sent home by Ramsay. In Episode 1, the teams selected captains for service, though Ramsay changed both captains during service.

Episodes

Notes

References

External links 
 Hell's Kitchen official Fox.com
 Hell's Kitchen program description and commentary at the Internet Movie Database website

Hell's Kitchen (American TV series)
2008 American television seasons